"Any Means Necessary" is a song by the Swedish power and heavy metal band HammerFall released as a single from their album, No Sacrifice, No Victory. It is included in a promo CD which comes in a cardboard sleeve and only has the track on it.The single was also released as a digital only EP featuring five tracks, listed below, of which four of them are considered the band's best songs.

Track listing

Personnel 

Joacim Cans - Vocals
Oscar Dronjak - Guitars
Pontus Norgren - Guitars
Fredrik Larsson - Bass
Anders Johansson - Drums

Music video 
The song "Any Means Necessary" was also made into a music video.

Release information 
The single was also released as a limited 7" Vinyl edition with Picture Disc and has two tracks: "Any Means Necessary" and "My Sharona".

References

External links 
Official HammerFall website

2009 singles
2009 songs
HammerFall songs
Nuclear Blast Records singles
Songs written by Joacim Cans
Songs written by Oscar Dronjak